Oliver Dynham B.A. (also Denham) (d. 1500) was a Canon of Windsor from 1480 to 1500

Career
He was appointed:
Prebendary of Lichfield 1467
Archdeacon of Norfolk 1488
Archdeacon of Surrey 1500

He was appointed to the seventh stall in St George's Chapel, Windsor Castle in 1480 and held this until 1500. His will was made 22 April and proved 30 May 1500, naming his brother John, Lord Denham as his heir.

See also 
Catholic Church in England

Notes 

1500 deaths
Canons of Windsor
Archdeacons of Norfolk
Archdeacons of Surrey
Year of birth missing